Sabrina Stultiens (born 8 July 1993) is a Dutch road and cyclo-cross racing cyclist, who currently rides for UCI Women's WorldTeam .

Stultiens won the women's under-23 road race at the 2014 European Road Championships. This qualified her to compete in the women's road race at the 2014 Road World Championships, in which she finished in 56th place out of 134 entrants. In cyclo-cross, Stultiens finished eighth in the 2013 World Championships.

Major results

Cyclo-cross

2011–2012
 3rd Cyclo-cross Zonhoven, Superprestige
 7th Women's race, UEC European Cyclo-cross Championships
2012–2013
 2nd Sluitingsprijs Oostmalle, bpost bank trophy
 2nd Caubergcross
 3rd Women's race, National Cyclo-cross Championships
 3rd Overall Superprestige
3rd Cyclo-cross Zonhoven
3rd Vlaamse Aardbeiencross
 8th Women's race, UCI Cyclo-cross World Championships
2013–2014
 3rd Women's race, National Cyclo-cross Championships
 3rd Superprestige Gieten, Superprestige
 3rd Jaarmarktcross Niel
2014–2015
 1st Zilvermeercross
 1st Cyclocross Leuven
 3rd Women's race, National Cyclo-cross Championships
 6th Overall UCI Cyclo-cross World Cup
2nd Duinencross Koksijde
2015–2016
 2nd Women's race, National Cyclo-cross Championships
 2nd Zilvermeercross
 6th Women's race, UCI Cyclo-cross World Championships

Road

2013
 1st Young rider classification Emakumeen Euskal Bira
 9th Holland Hills Classic
2014
 1st  Road race, UEC European Under-23 Road Championships
 6th Holland Hills Classic
 7th Giro del Trentino Alto Adige-Südtirol
 8th Overall La Route de France
1st  Young rider classification
2015
 2nd Overall Auensteiner–Radsporttage
1st  Young rider classification
 2nd 94.7 Cycle Challenge
 4th Holland Hills Classic
 6th Time trial, UEC European Under-23 Road Championships
2017
 1st  Team time trial, UCI Road World Championships
2018
 1st Stage 1 Emakumeen Euskal Bira
 3rd Durango-Durango Emakumeen Saria
 6th Liège–Bastogne–Liège
 7th La Flèche Wallonne Féminine
 10th Overall The Women's Tour
2020
 5th Giro dell'Emilia Internazionale Donne Elite
2021
 4th Donostia San Sebastián Klasikoa
 10th Durango-Durango Emakumeen Saria

See also
2012 Rabobank Women Cycling Team season
2014 Rabo Liv Women Cycling Team season

References

External links
 

1993 births
Living people
Dutch female cyclists
Sportspeople from Helmond
UCI Road World Championships cyclists for the Netherlands
Cyclists from North Brabant
20th-century Dutch women
21st-century Dutch women